Cirkus homo sapiens is the first studio album by Swedish singer/songwriter Nanne Grönvall, released in April 1998. The album was re-released in June 1999 under Somco Records, Nanne and husband Peter Grönvall's own record label. This re-release had a different cover and included the 1997-recorded "Kul i jul" as bonus track.

Track listing

References 

1998 albums
1999 albums
Nanne Grönvall albums